The Sea Peoples are a hypothesized seafaring confederation that attacked ancient Egypt and other regions in the East Mediterranean before and during the Late Bronze Age collapse (1200–900 BCE). Following the creation of the concept in the 19th century, the Sea Peoples' incursions became one of the most famous chapters of Egyptian history, given its connection with, in the words of Wilhelm Max Müller, "the most important questions of ethnography and the primitive history of classic nations".

The origins of the Sea Peoples are undocumented. It has been proposed that the Sea Peoples originated from a number of different locations, such as western Asia Minor, the Aegean, the Mediterranean islands, and Southern Europe. Although the archaeological inscriptions do not include reference to a migration, the Sea Peoples are conjectured to have sailed around the eastern Mediterranean and invaded Anatolia, Syria, Phoenicia, Canaan, Cyprus, and Egypt toward the end of the Bronze Age.

French Egyptologist Emmanuel de Rougé first used the term  (literally "peoples of the sea") in 1855 in a description of reliefs on the Second Pylon at Medinet Habu, documenting Year 8 of Ramesses III. In the late 19th century, Gaston Maspero, de Rougé's successor at the Collège de France, subsequently popularized the term "Sea Peoples" and an associated migration theory. Since the early 1990s, his migration theory has been brought into question by a number of scholars.

The Sea Peoples remain unidentified in the eyes of most modern scholars, and hypotheses regarding the origin of the various groups are the source of much speculation. Existing theories variously propose that they were any of several Aegean tribes, raiders from Central Europe, scattered soldiers who turned to piracy or became refugees, or migrants linked to natural disasters such as earthquakes or climatic shifts.

History of the concept

The concept of the Sea Peoples was first described by Emmanuel de Rougé in 1855, then curator of the Louvre, in his work Note on Some Hieroglyphic Texts Recently Published by Mr. Greene, describing the battles of Ramesses III described on the Second Pylon at Medinet Habu, and based upon recent photographs of the temple by John Beasley Greene. De Rougé noted that "in the crests of the conquered peoples the Sherden and the Teresh bear the designation of the ", in a reference to the prisoners depicted at the base of the Fortified East Gate. In 1867, de Rougé published his Excerpts of a dissertation on the attacks directed against Egypt by the peoples of the Mediterranean in the 14th century BCE, which focused primarily on the battles of Ramesses II and Merneptah and which proposed translations for many of the geographic names included in the hieroglyphic inscriptions. De Rougé later became chair of Egyptology at the Collège de France and was succeeded by Gaston Maspero. Maspero built upon de Rougé's work and published The Struggle of the Nations, in which he described the theory of the seaborne migrations in detail in 1895–96 for a wider audience, at a time when the idea of population migrations would have felt familiar to the general population.

The migration theory was taken up by other scholars such as Eduard Meyer and became the generally accepted theory amongst Egyptologists and Orientalists. Since the early 1990s, however, it has been brought into question by a number of scholars.

The historical narrative stems primarily from seven Ancient Egyptian sources and although in these inscriptions the designation "of the sea" does not appear in relation to all of these peoples, the term "Sea Peoples" is commonly used in modern publications to refer to the following nine peoples, in alphabetical order:

Primary documentary records
The Medinet Habu inscriptions from which the Sea Peoples concept was first described remain the primary source and "the basis of virtually all significant discussions of them".

Three separate narratives from Egyptian records refer to more than one of the nine peoples, found in a total of six sources. The seventh and most recent source referring to more than one of the nine peoples is a list (Onomasticon) of 610 entities, rather than a narrative. These sources are summarized in the table below.

Ramesses II narrative

Possible records of sea peoples generally or in particular date to two campaigns of Ramesses II, a pharaoh of the militant 19th Dynasty: operations in or near the delta in Year 2 of his reign and the major confrontation with the Hittite Empire and allies at the Battle of Kadesh in his Year 5. The years of this long-lived pharaoh's reign are not known exactly, but they must have comprised nearly all of the first half of the 13th century BCE.

In his Second Year, an attack of the Sherden, or Shardana, on the Nile Delta was repulsed and defeated by Ramesses, who captured some of the pirates. The event is recorded on Tanis Stele II. An inscription by Ramesses II on the stela from Tanis which recorded the Sherden raiders' raid and subsequent capture speaks of the continuous threat they posed to Egypt's Mediterranean coasts:

The Sherden prisoners were subsequently incorporated into the Egyptian army for service on the Hittite frontier by Ramesses and fought as Egyptian soldiers in the Battle of Kadesh. Another stele usually cited in conjunction with this one is the "Aswan Stele" (there were other stelae at Aswan), which mentions the king's operations to defeat a number of peoples including those of the "Great Green (the Egyptian name for the Mediterranean)". It is plausible to assume that the Tanis and Aswan Stelae refer to the same event, in which case they reinforce each other.

The Battle of Kadesh was the outcome of a campaign against the Hittites and their allies in the Levant in the pharaoh's Year 5. The imminent collision of the Egyptian and Hittite empires became obvious to both, and they both prepared campaigns against the strategic midpoint of Kadesh for the next year. Ramesses divided his Egyptian forces, which were then ambushed piecemeal by the Hittite army and nearly defeated. Ramesses was separated from his forces and had to fight singlehandedly to get back to his troops. He then mustered several counterattacks while waiting for reinforcements. Once the reinforcements from the South and East arrived, the Egyptians managed to drive the Hittites back to Kadesh.  While it was a strategic Egyptian victory, neither side managed to attain their operational objectives.

At home, Ramesses had his scribes formulate an official description, which has been called "the Bulletin" because it was widely published by inscription. Ten copies survive today on the temples at Abydos, Karnak, Luxor and Abu Simbel, with reliefs depicting the battle. The "Poem of Pentaur", describing the battle survived also.

The poem relates that the previously captured Sherden were not only working for the Pharaoh but were also formulating a plan of battle for him; i.e. it was their idea to divide Egyptian forces into four columns. There is no evidence of any collaboration with the Hittites or malicious intent on their part, and if Ramesses considered it, he never left any record of that consideration.

The poem lists the peoples who went to Kadesh as allies of the Hittites. Amongst them are some of the sea peoples spoken of in the Egyptian inscriptions previously mentioned, and many of the peoples who would later take part in the great migrations of the 12th century BCE (see Appendix A to the Battle of Kadesh).

Merneptah narrative

The major event of the reign of the Pharaoh Merneptah (1213 BCE – 1203 BCE), 4th king of the 19th Dynasty, was his battle at Perire in the western delta in the 5th and 6th years of his reign, against a confederacy termed "the Nine Bows". Depredations of this confederacy had been so severe that the region was "forsaken as pasturage for cattle, it was left waste from the time of the ancestors".

The pharaoh's action against them is attested in a single narrative found in three sources. The most detailed source describing the battle is the Great Karnak Inscription; two shorter versions of the same narrative are found in the "Athribis Stele" and the "Cairo Column". The "Cairo column" is a section of a granite column now in the Cairo Museum, which was first published by Maspero in 1881 with just two readable sentences – the first confirming the date of Year 5 and the second stating: "The wretched [chief] of Libya has invaded with ——, being men and women, Shekelesh (S'-k-rw-s) ——". The "Athribis stela" is a granite stela found in Athribis and inscribed on both sides, which like the Cairo column, was first published by Maspero two years later in 1883. The Merneptah Stele from Thebes describes the reign of peace resulting from the victory but does not include any reference to the Sea Peoples.

The Nine Bows were acting under the leadership of the king of Libya and an associated near-concurrent revolt in Canaan involving Gaza, Ashkelon, Yenoam and the Israelites. Exactly which peoples were consistently in the Nine Bows is not clear, but present at the battle were the Libyans, some neighboring Meshwesh, and possibly a separate revolt in the following year involving peoples from the eastern Mediterranean, including the Kheta (or Hittites), or Syrians, and (in the Israel Stele) for the first time in history, the Israelites. In addition to them, the first lines of the Karnak inscription include some sea peoples, which must have arrived in the Western Delta or from Cyrene by ship:

Later in the inscription Merneptah receives news of the attack:

"His majesty was enraged at their report, like a lion", assembled his court and gave a rousing speech. Later, he dreamed he saw Ptah handing him a sword and saying, "Take thou (it) and banish thou the fearful heart from thee." When the bowmen went forth, says the inscription, "Amun was with them as a shield." After six hours, the surviving Nine Bows threw down their weapons, abandoned their baggage and dependants, and ran for their lives. Merneptah states that he defeated the invasion, killing 6,000 soldiers and taking 9,000 prisoners. To be sure of the numbers, among other things, he took the penises of all uncircumcised enemy dead and the hands of all the circumcised, from which history learns that the Ekwesh were circumcised, a fact causing some to doubt they were Greek.

Ramesses III narrative

Ramesses III, who reigned for most of the first half of the 12th century BCE as the second pharaoh of the 20th Dynasty, confronted a later wave of invasions of the Sea Peoples in his eighth year. The battles were later recorded in two long inscriptions from his Medinet Habu mortuary temple, which are physically separate and somewhat different from one another. The Year 8 campaign is the best-recorded Sea Peoples invasion.

The fact that several civilizations collapsed around 1175 BCE has led to the suggestion that the Sea Peoples may have been involved at the end of the Hittite, Mycenaean and Mitanni kingdoms. The American Hittitologist Gary Beckman writes, on page 23 of Akkadica 120 (2000):

Ramesses' comments about the scale of the Sea Peoples' onslaught in the eastern Mediterranean are confirmed by the destruction of the states of Hatti, Ugarit, Ashkelon and Hazor around this time. As the Hittitologist Trevor Bryce observes:

This situation is confirmed by the Medinet Habu temple reliefs of Ramesses III which show that:

The inscriptions of Ramesses III at his Medinet Habu mortuary temple in Thebes record three victorious campaigns against the Sea Peoples that are considered bona fide, in Years 5, 8 and 12, as well as three considered spurious, against the Nubians and Libyans in Year 5 and the Libyans with Asiatics in Year 11. During Year 8 some Hittites were operating with the Sea Peoples.

The inner west wall of the second court describes the invasion of Year 5. Only the Peleset and Tjeker are mentioned, but the list is lost in a lacuna. The attack was two-pronged, one by sea and one by land. That is, the Sea Peoples divided their forces. Ramesses was waiting in the Nile mouths and trapped the enemy fleet there. The land forces were defeated separately.

The Sea Peoples did not learn any lessons from this defeat, as they repeated their mistake in Year 8 with a similar result. The campaign is recorded more extensively on the inner northwest panel of the first court. It is possible, but not generally believed, that the dates are only those of the inscriptions and both refer to the same campaign.

In Ramesses' Year 8, the Nine Bows appear again as a "conspiracy in their isles". This time, they are revealed unquestionably as Sea Peoples: the Peleset, Tjeker, Shekelesh, Denyen and Weshesh, which are classified as "foreign countries" in the inscription. They camped in Amor and sent a fleet to the Nile.

The pharaoh was once more waiting for them. He had built a fleet especially for the occasion, hid it in the Nile's mouths and posted coast watchers. The enemy fleet was ambushed there, their ships overturned, and the men dragged up on shore and executed ad hoc.

The land army was also routed within Egyptian controlled territory. Additional information is given in the relief on the outer side of the east wall. This land battle occurred in the vicinity of Djahy against "the northern countries". When it was over, several chiefs were captive: of Hatti, Amor and Shasu among the "land peoples" and the Tjeker, "Sherden of the sea", "Teresh of the sea" and Peleset or Philistines.

The campaign of Year 12 is attested by the Südstele found on the south side of the temple. It mentions the Tjeker, Peleset, Denyen, Weshesh and Shekelesh.

Papyrus Harris I of the period, found behind the temple, suggests a wider campaign against the Sea Peoples but does not mention the date. In it, the persona of Ramses III says, "I slew the Denyen (D'-yn-yw-n) in their isles" and "burned" the Tjeker and Peleset, implying a maritime raid of his own. He also captured some Sherden and Weshesh "of the sea" and settled them in Egypt. As he is called the "Ruler of Nine Bows" in the relief of the east side, these events probably happened in Year 8; i.e. the Pharaoh would have used the victorious fleet for some punitive expeditions elsewhere in the Mediterranean.

The Rhetorical Stela to Ramesses III, Chapel C, Deir el-Medina records a similar narrative.

Onomasticon of Amenope
The Onomasticon of Amenope, or Amenemipit (amen-em-apt), gives slight credence to the idea that the Ramesside kings settled the Sea Peoples in Canaan. Dated to about 1100 BCE (at the end of the 22nd dynasty) this document simply lists names. After six place names, four of which were in Philistia, the scribe lists the Sherden (Line 268), the Tjeker (Line 269) and the Peleset (Line 270), who might be presumed to occupy those cities. The Story of Wenamun on a papyrus of the same cache also places the Tjeker in Dor at that time. The fact that the Biblical maritime Tribe of Dan was initially located between the Philistines and the Tjekker, has prompted some to suggest that they may have originally been Denyen. Sherden seem to have been settled around Megiddo and in the Jordan Valley, and Weshwesh (connected by some with the Biblical tribe of Asher) may have been settled further north.

Other documentary records

Egyptian single-name sources
Other Egyptian sources refer to one of the individual groups without reference to any of the other groups.

The Amarna letters, around the mid-14th century BCE, including four relating to the Sea Peoples: 
 EA 151 refers to the Denyen, in a passing reference to the death of their king;
 EA 38 refers to the Lukka, who are being accused of attacking the Egyptians in conjunction with the Alashiyans (Cypriotes), with the latter having stated that the Lukka were seizing their villages.
 EA 81, EA 122 and EA 123 refer to the Sherden. The letters at one point refer to a Sherden man as an apparent renegade mercenary, and at another point to three Sherden who are slain by an Egyptian overseer.

Padiiset's Statue refers to the Peleset, the Cairo Column refers to the Shekelesh, the Story of Wenamun refers to the Tjekker, and 13 further Egyptian sources refer to the Sherden.

Byblos

The earliest ethnic group later considered among the Sea Peoples is believed to be attested in Egyptian hieroglyphs on the Abishemu obelisk found in the Temple of the Obelisks at Byblos by Maurice Dunand. The inscription mentions kwkwn son of rwqq- (or kukun son of luqq), transliterated as Kukunnis, son of Lukka, "the Lycian". The date is given variously as 2000 or 1700 BCE

Ugarit

Some Sea Peoples appear in four of the Ugaritic texts, the last three of which seem to foreshadow the destruction of the city around 1180 BCE. The letters are therefore dated to the early 12th century. The last king of Ugarit was Ammurapi ( 1191–1182 BCE), who, throughout this correspondence, is quite a young man.
 RS 34.129, the earliest letter, found on the south side of the city, from "the Great King", presumably Suppiluliuma II of the Hittites, to the prefect of the city. He says that he ordered the king of Ugarit to send him Ibnadushu for questioning, but the king was too immature to respond. He, therefore, wants the prefect to send the man, whom he promises to return. What this language implies about the relationship of the Hittite empire to Ugarit is a matter of interpretation. Ibnadushu had been kidnapped by and had resided among a people of Shikala, probably the Shekelesh, "who lived on ships". The letter is generally interpreted as an interest in military intelligence by the king.
 RS L 1, RS 20.238 and RS 20.18, are a set from the Rap'anu Archive between a slightly older Ammurapi, now handling his own affairs, and Eshuwara, the grand supervisor of Alasiya. Evidently, Ammurapi had informed Eshuwara, that an enemy fleet of 20 ships had been spotted at sea. Eshuwara wrote back and inquired about the location of Ammurapi's own forces. Eshuwara also noted that he would like to know where the enemy fleet of 20 ships are now located. Unfortunately for both Ugarit and Alasiya, neither kingdom was able to fend off the Sea People's onslaught, and both were ultimately destroyed. A letter by Ammurapi (RS 18.147) to the king of Alasiya—which was in fact a response to an appeal for assistance by the latter—has been found by archaeologists. In it, Ammurapi describes the desperate plight facing Ugarit. Ammurapi, in turn, appealed for aid from the viceroy of Carchemish, which actually survived the Sea People's onslaught; King Kuzi-Teshub I, who was the son of Talmi-Teshub—a direct contemporary of the last ruling Hittite king, Suppiluliuma II—is attested in power there, running a mini-empire which stretched from "Southeast Asia Minor, North Syria ... [to] the west bend of the Euphrates" from c. 1175 BCE to 990 BCE. Its viceroy could only offer some words of advice for Ammurapi.

Hypotheses about origins
A number of hypotheses concerning the origins, identities and motives of the Sea Peoples described in the records have been formulated. They are not necessarily alternative or contradictory hypotheses about the Sea Peoples; any or all might be mainly or partly true.

Regional migration historical context

The Late Bronze Age Mycenaean Greek Linear B tablets of Pylos in the Peloponnese along the Ionian Sea demonstrate increased slave raiding and the spread of mercenaries and migratory peoples and their subsequent resettlement. Despite this, the actual identity of the Sea Peoples has remained enigmatic and modern scholars have only the scattered records of ancient civilizations and archaeological analysis to inform them. Evidence shows that the identities and motives of these peoples were known to the Egyptians. In fact, many had sought employment with the Egyptians or were in a diplomatic relationship for a few centuries before the Late Bronze Age collapse. For example, select groups, or members of groups, of the Sea People, such as the Sherden or Shardana, were used as mercenaries by Egyptian Pharaohs such as Ramesses II.

Prior to the Third Intermediate Period of Egypt (from the 15th century BCE), names of Semitic-speaking, cattle-raising pastoral nomads of the Levant appear, replacing previous Egyptian concern with the Hurrianised prw ('Apiru or Habiru). These were called the š3sw (Shasu), meaning "those who move on foot". e.g. the Shasu of Yhw. Nancy Sandars uses the analogous name "land peoples". Contemporary Assyrian records refer to them as Ahhlamu or Wanderers. They were not part of the Egyptian list of Sea Peoples, and were later referred to as Aramaeans.

Some people, such as the Lukka, were included in both categories of land and sea people.

Philistine hypothesis 

The archaeological evidence from the southern coastal plain of ancient Canaan, termed Philistia in the Hebrew Bible, indicates a disruption of the Canaanite culture that existed during the Late Bronze Age and its replacement (with some integration) by a culture with a possibly foreign (mainly Aegean) origin. This includes distinct pottery, which at first belongs to the Mycenaean IIIC tradition (albeit of local manufacture) and gradually transforms into uniquely Philistine pottery. Mazar says:

Sandars, however, does not take this point of view but says:

Artifacts of the Philistine culture are found at numerous sites, in particular in the excavations of the five main cities of the Philistines: the Pentapolis of Ashkelon, Ashdod, Ekron, Gath, and Gaza. Some scholars (e.g. S. Sherratt, Drews, etc.) have challenged the theory that the Philistine culture is an immigrant culture, claiming instead that they are an in situ development of the Canaanite culture, but others argue for the immigrant hypothesis; for example, T. Dothan and Barako.

Trude and Moshe Dothan suggest that the later Philistine settlements in the Levant were unoccupied for nearly 30 years between their destruction and resettlement by the Philistines, whose Helladic IIICb pottery also shows Egyptian influences.

With the advent of archaeogenetics, the Aegean hypothesis regarding the origin of the Philistines has received a major boost. A study by Michal Feldman and colleagues that carried out genomic testing of 10 Bronze Age and Iron Age individuals from Ashkelon, reported that the early Iron Age population was genetically distinct from both late Bronze Age and late Iron Age tested individuals as a result of transient European-related admixture. The authors concluded that a migration event occurred during the Bronze to Iron Age transition in Ashkelon from an Aegean-related source, even though this migration did not leave a long-lasting genetic signature.

Minoan hypothesis

Two of the peoples who settled in the Levant had traditions that may connect them to Crete: the Tjeker and the Peleset. The Tjeker may have left Crete to settle in Anatolia, and left there to settle Dor. According to the Old Testament, the Israelite God brought the Philistines out of Caphtor. The mainstream of Biblical and classical scholarship accepts Caphtor to refer to Crete, but there are alternative minority theories. Crete at the time was populated by peoples speaking many languages, among which were Mycenaean Greek and Eteocretan, the descendant of the language of the Minoans. It is possible, but by no means certain, that these two peoples spoke Eteocretan.

Recent examinations of the eruption of the Santorini volcano estimate its occurrence at between 1660 and 1613 BCE, centuries before the first appearances of the Sea Peoples in Egypt. The eruption is thus unlikely to be connected to the Sea Peoples.

Greek migrational hypothesis 

The identifications of Denyen with the Greek Danaans and Ekwesh with the Greek Achaeans are long-standing issues in Bronze Age scholarship, whether Greek, Hittite or Biblical, especially as they lived "in the isles". The Greek identification of the Ekwesh is considered especially problematic as this group was clearly described as circumcised by the Egyptians, and according to Manuel Robbins: "Hardly anyone thinks that the Greeks of the Bronze Age were circumcised ..." Michael Wood described the hypothetical role of the Greeks (who have already been proposed as the identity of the Philistines above):

Wood would also include the Sherden and Shekelesh, pointing out that "there were migrations of Greek-speaking peoples to the same place [Sardinia and Sicily] at this time." He is careful to point out that the Greeks would have been only one element among many that comprised the sea peoples. Furthermore, the proportion of Greeks must have been relatively small. His major hypothesis is that the Trojan War was fought against Troy VI and Troy VIIa, the candidate of Carl Blegen, and that Troy was sacked by those now identified as Greek Sea Peoples. He suggests that Odysseus' assumed identity as a wandering Cretan coming home from the Trojan War, who fights in Egypt and serves there after being captured, "remembers" the campaign of Year 8 of Ramses III, described above. He points out also that places destroyed on Cyprus at the time (such as Kition) were rebuilt by a new Greek-speaking population. Several scholars have proposed that the Sea People were certainly Mycenaean Greeks.

Trojan hypothesis

The possibility that the Teresh were connected on the one hand with the Tyrrhenians, believed to be an Etruscan-related culture, or on the other with Taruisa, a Hittite name possibly referring to Troy, has been speculated. The Roman poet Virgil depicts Aeneas as escaping the fall of Troy by coming to Latium to found a line descending to Romulus, first king of Rome. Considering that Anatolian connections have been identified for other Sea Peoples, such as the Tjeker and the Lukka, Eberhard Zangger puts together an Anatolian hypothesis, but it is not accepted for archaeological,  linguistic, anthropological and genetic reasons. Virgil's account refers to the foundation of Rome, not to the Etruscans, and is not believed to contain true events. Furthermore, there is no archaeological or linguistic evidence of a migration in the late Bronze Age from Anatolia to Etruria, and the Etruscan language, as well as all the languages of the Tyrrhenian family, considered Pre-Indo-European and Paleo-European, belongs to a completely different family from the Anatolian one which is Indo-European. Moreover, both recent studies of anthropology and genetics have argued in favor of the indigenous origin of the Etruscans and against the hypothesis of eastern origin.

Mycenaean warfare hypothesis

This theory suggests that the Sea Peoples were populations from the city-states of the Greek Mycenaean civilization, who destroyed each other in a disastrous series of conflicts lasting several decades. There would have been few or no external invaders and just a few excursions outside the Greek-speaking part of the Aegean civilization.

Archaeological evidence indicates that many fortified sites of the Greek domain were destroyed in the late 13th and early 12th century BCE, which was understood in the mid-20th century to have been simultaneous or nearly so and was attributed to the Dorian invasion championed by Carl Blegen of the University of Cincinnati. He believed Mycenaean Pylos was burned during an amphibious raid by warriors from the north (Dorians).

Subsequent critical analysis focused on the fact that the destructions were not simultaneous and that all the evidence of Dorians comes from later times. John Chadwick championed a Sea Peoples hypothesis, which asserted that, since the Pylians had retreated to the northeast, the attack must have come from the southwest, the Sea Peoples being, in his view, the most likely candidates. He suggests that they were based in Anatolia and, although doubting that the Mycenaeans would have called themselves "Achaeans", speculates that "it is very tempting to bring them into connexion." He does not assign a Greek identity to all of the Sea Peoples.

Considering the turbulence between and within the great families of the Mycenaean city-states in Greek mythology, the hypothesis that the Mycenaeans destroyed themselves is long-standing and finds support by the ancient Greek historian Thucydides, who theorized:

Although some advocates of the Philistine or Greek migration hypotheses identify all the Mycenaeans or Sea Peoples as ethnically Greek, John Chadwick (founder, with Michael Ventris, of Linear B studies) adopts instead the multiple ethnicity view.

Nuragic and Italian peoples hypotheses

Some archeologists believe that the Sherden are identifiable with the Sardinians from the Nuragic era.

Theories of the possible connections between the Sherden to Sardinia, Shekelesh to Sicily, and Teresh to Tyrrhenians, even though long-standing, are based on onomastic similarities.
Nuragic pottery of domestic use has been found at Pyla Kokkinokremos, a fortified settlement in Cyprus, during the 2010 and 2017 excavations. The site is dated to the period between the 13th and 12th centuries BCE, that of the Sea Peoples' invasions. This find has led archaeologist Vassos Karageorghis to identify the Nuragic Sardinians with the Sherden, one of the Sea Peoples. According to him, the Sherden went first to Crete and from there they joined the Cretans in an eastward expedition to Cyprus.

The Nuragic bronze statuettes, a great collection of Nuragic sculptures, includes a great number of horned helmet warriors wearing a similar skirt to the Sherdens' and a round shield; although they had been dated for a long time to the 10th or 9th century BCE, recent discoveries suggest that their production started around the 13th century BCE. Swords identical to those of the Sherden have been found in Sardinia, dating back to 1650 BCE

The self-name of the Etruscans, Rasna, does not lend itself to the Tyrrhenian derivation, although it has been suggested that this was itself derived from an earlier form T'Rasna. The Etruscan civilization has been studied, and the language partly deciphered. It has variants and representatives in Aegean inscriptions, but these may well be from travelers or colonists of Etruscans during their seafaring period before Rome destroyed their power.

There is no definitive archaeological evidence. About all that can be said for certain is that Mycenaean IIIC pottery was widespread around the Mediterranean in areas associated with Sea Peoples and its introduction at various places is often associated with cultural change, violent or gradual. An old theory is that the Sherden and Shekelesh brought those names with them to Sardinia and Sicily, "perhaps not operating from those great islands but moving toward them", and this is still accepted by Eric Cline and by Trevor Bryce, who explains that some of the Sea Peoples sprang out of the collapsing Hittite empire. Giovanni Ugas believes that the Sherden originated in Sardinia, and his studies have been echoed by Sebastiano Tusa, in his last book, and by Carlos Roberto Zorea, from the Complutense University of Madrid.

Anatolian famine hypothesis
A famous passage from Herodotus portrays the wandering and migration of Lydians from Anatolia because of famine:

However, the 1st-century BC historian Dionysius of Halicarnassus, a Greek living in Rome, dismissed many of the ancient theories of other Greek historians and postulated that the Etruscans were indigenous people who had always lived in Etruria and were different from the Lydians. Dionysius noted that the 5th-century historian Xanthus of Lydia, who was originally from Sardis and was regarded as an important source and authority for the history of Lydia, never suggested a Lydian origin of the Etruscans and never named Tyrrhenus as a ruler of the Lydians.

Tablet RS 18.38 from Ugarit also mentions grain to the Hittites, suggesting a long period of famine, connected further, in the full theory, to drought. Barry Weiss, using the Palmer Drought Index for 35 Greek, Turkish, and Middle Eastern weather stations, showed that a drought of the kinds that persisted from January 1972 would have affected all of the sites associated with the Late Bronze Age collapse. Drought could have easily precipitated or hastened socio-economic problems and led to wars. More recently, Brian Fagan has shown how mid-winter storms from the Atlantic were diverted to travel north of the Pyrenees and the Alps, bringing wetter conditions to Central Europe, but drought to the Eastern Mediterranean. More recent paleoclimatological research has also shown climatic disruption and increasing aridity in the Eastern Mediterranean, associated with the North Atlantic Oscillation at this time (See Bronze Age Collapse).

Invader hypothesis 

The term "invasion" is used generally in the literature concerning the period to mean the documented attacks, implying that the aggressors were external to the eastern Mediterranean, though often hypothesized to be from the wider Aegean world. An origin outside the Aegean also has been proposed, as in this example by Michael Grant: "There was a gigantic series of migratory waves, extending all the way from the Danube valley to the plains of China."

Such a comprehensive movement is associated with more than one people or culture; instead, it was a "disturbance", according to Finley:

If different times are allowed on the Danube, they are not in the Aegean: "all this destruction must be dated to the same period about 1200 [BCE]."

The movements of the hypothetical Dorian Invasion, the attacks of the Sea Peoples, the formation of Philistine kingdoms in the Levant and the fall of the Hittite Empire were associated and compressed by Finley into the 1200 BCE window.

Robert Drews presents a map showing the destruction sites of 47 fortified major settlements, which he terms "Major Sites Destroyed in the Catastrophe". They are concentrated in the Levant, with some in Greece and Anatolia.

See also 
 Beder (ancient ruler)
 Hyksos
 Meryey
 Thalassocracy

References

Citations

Notes

Sources

Primary sources: Early publications of the theory

Secondary sources 

 Mainz.
Beckman, Gary, "Hittite Chronology", Akkadica, 119/120 (2000).
 Volume II on the 19th Dynasty is available for download from Google Books.

 

 3 vols.

 

 Chapter 16: Vagnetti, Lucia (2000), Western Mediterranean overview: Peninsular Italy, Sicily and Sardinia at the time of the Sea peoples

External links

 Cline, Eric. 1177 BC: The Year Civilization Collapsed [video], recorded lecture, 2016, 1h10'17.
Philistine Kin Found in Early Israel, Adam Zertal, BAR 28:03, May/Jun 2002.
The Sea Peoples and the Philistines: a course at Penn State
Egyptians, Canaanites, and Philistines in the Period of the Emergence of Early Israel, paper by Itamar Singer at the UCLA Near Eastern Languages & Culture site
"Who Were the Sea People?", article by Eberhard Zangger in Saudi Aramco World, Volume 46, Number 3, May/June 1995
PlosOne dating the Sea People destruction of the Levant to 1192–90 BCE
"The Battle of the Nile – Circa 1190 B.C.", article by I Cornelius in Military History Journal, Vol. 7., No. 4 of the South African Military History Society
"The Greek Age of Bronze", Archaeological web site related to Greek Bronze Age and Sea Peoples weaponry and warfare

 
1850s neologisms
Ancient Egypt
Ancient Italian history
Ancient Levant
Ancient peoples
Ancient pirates
History of the Mediterranean
Indo-European history
Indo-European warfare
Invasions of Egypt
Iron Age Anatolia
Iron Age Greece
Late Bronze Age collapse